Britain's Best Buildings was a BBC documentary series in which the TV presenter and architectural historian Dan Cruickshank discussed his selection of the finest examples of British architecture. It was first broadcast on BBC Two from 2 to 23 November 2002, and returned on BBC Four from 5 May to 2 June 2004.

Episode list

Series one
Tower Bridge 2 November 2002
Blenheim Palace 9 November 2002
Durham Cathedral 16 November 2002
Windsor Castle 23 November 2002

Series two
Harlech Castle 5 May 2004
Palace of Westminster 12 May 2004
Hardwick Hall 19 May 2004
The Circus, Bath 26 May 2004
Forth Bridge 2 June 2004

Edited editions of the Palace of Westminster edition (ranging from 5–15 minutes) are often shown on the BBC Parliament channel, when live coverage of the House of Commons, House of Lords, committees etc. ends early, before the beginning of the next programme. These edited editions are used to fill the gaps.

The UKTV channel Yesterday frequently repeats the series. However the episodes are shown in an edited 46 minute format to allow for commercials.

Companion book
The 2002 companion book to the series, also written by Cruickshank, covers the four buildings featured in the first series along with four additional buildings; these are Holyroodhouse, Edinburgh; Cardiff Castle; Midland Grand Hotel, St Pancras station, London; and Highpoint I, London.

Selected editions

External links
 
Britain's Best Buildings BBC press release
Choosing Britain's Best Buildings  by Dan Cruickshank at BBC History
Building Styles Gallery at BBC History
 

2002 British television series debuts
2004 British television series endings
2000s British documentary television series
BBC television documentaries about history
Documentary television series about architecture
English-language television shows
Documentary television series about art
Television shows about British architecture